(At midnight), WAB 89, is a song composed by Anton Bruckner in 1864.

History 
Bruckner composed the song on a text of Robert Prutz on 12 April 1864, for the Linz Liedertafel Sängerbund (the rival of Liedertafel Frohsinn). The piece was performed on 11 December 1864 by Sängerbund in the Redoutensaal under Bruckner's baton. The work, of which the original manuscript is stored in the Österreichische Nationalbibliothek, was first issued by Viktor Keldorfer (Universal Edition) in 1911, together with the other setting (Um Mitternacht, WAB 90) and the other "midnight-song" Mitternacht, WAB 80.

Text 

Um Mitternacht uses a text by Robert Prutz.

Music 
The 56-bar long work in F minor is scored for  choir, alto soloist and piano. In strophe 1 the F-minor key forms the mystic background, from which the men's choir, accompanied by pedal points and unison lines of the piano, emerges in open fifths. Strophes 2 and 3 are sung by the alto soloist with accompaniment of the choir. In strophe 4 the melody of strophe 1 is sung again by the choir and the soloist. Bars 14-16 (end of strophe 1) and 27-34 (strophe 3) are sung a cappella. The song is ending pianissimo with the piano alone.

In the first issue of 1911, Keldorfer wrote "" (The enchantment of the poetry of the moonlight has apparently captivated fully Bruckners sensible nature. In the ban of such dreamily mystic feelings he composed three 'midnight-choirs').

Discography 

, WAB 89, is one of the most popular Bruckner's Weltliche Chorwerke.

A selection of the about 10 other recordings:
 Hubert Günther, Ingrid Günther (alto), Männergesangverein Concordia Hamm, Willy Nölling (piano), Musik im Schloss – LP: Garnet G 40 107, c. 1976
 Guido Mancusi, Julia Bernheimer (alto), Chorus Viennensis, Walter Lochmann (piano), Musik, du himmlisches Gebilde! – CD: ORF CD 73, 1995
 Thomas Kerbl, Katrin Wundsam (alto), Männerchorvereinigung Bruckner 08, Mariko Onishi (piano), Anton Bruckner – Männerchöre – CD: LIVA027, 2008
 Jan Schumacher, Alison Browner (mezzo-soprano), Camerata Musica Limburg, Andreas Frese (piano) Serenade. Songs of night and love – CD: Genuin GEN 12224, 2011

References

Sources 
 Anton Bruckner – Sämtliche Werke, Band XXIII/2:  Weltliche Chorwerke (1843–1893), Musikwissenschaftlicher Verlag der Internationalen Bruckner-Gesellschaft, Angela Pachovsky and Anton Reinthaler (Editor), Vienna, 1989
 Cornelis van Zwol, Anton Bruckner 1824–1896 – Leven en werken, uitg. Thoth, Bussum, Netherlands, 2012. 
 Uwe Harten, Anton Bruckner. Ein Handbuch. , Salzburg, 1996. .
 Crawford Howie, Anton Bruckner - A documentary biography, online revised edition

External links 
 
 Um Mitternacht f-Moll, WAB 89 – Critical discography by Hans Roelofs 
 Can be heard on YouTube:
 The performance by the Wiener Sängerknaben (1955): Um Mitternacht (WAB 89)
 A performance by Esteban Urzelai with the Suhar Choir: Um Mitternacht (WAB 89)

Weltliche Chorwerke by Anton Bruckner
1864 compositions
Compositions in F minor